This article contains the discography of American soul and R&B singer-songwriter Rahsaan Patterson, it includes studio albums, compilation albums, singles and music videos.

Albums

Singles

Album appearances

As featured artist

Other appearances

Soundtracks

Others

Videography

Music videos
1996: "Stop By"
1997: "Where You Are" 
1999: "Treat You Like a Queen" 
2004: "The One for Me"
2007: "Stop Breaking My Heart" 
2008: "Feels Good" 
2010: "Easier Said Than Done"
2011: "6 AM"

References

External links
 Rahsaan Patterson's official homepage
Mack Avenue Artist Page

Discographies of American artists